Alfred Chandler may refer to:

Alfred Thomas Chandler (1852–1941), Australian newspaper editor
Alfred Chandler (politician) (1873–1935), Australian politician
Alfred D. Chandler Jr. (1918–2007), American business historian
Alfred W. Chandler (1890–1978), United States Navy admiral
Alfred Chandler (botanist) (1804–1896), English botanical artist